KCRH (89.9 FM) is a radio station in Hayward, California, serving the Bay Area, primarily the East Bay. The station is owned by Chabot College and operated by students in its Mass Communications department.

Overview 
KCRH broadcasts a wide variety of music geared towards the college audience and broadcasts Chabot College's sports games. The station recently relocated from an older room in the former humanities building (Building 900), where the station had been headquartered since it started in 1981, to a new location in the college's main office building (Building 100) in the center of campus as of the fall semester 2007.. The call letters were previously used by a defunct radio station in Nampa, Idaho.

Reach  
KCRH's signal can be heard throughout Hayward and can be heard as far north to East Oakland, far east to Dublin and far south to Union City.

Broadcast record 
Former personality Manuel Diaz, Jr. was once on-air for 38 straight hours (June 12–14, 2004), a record that still remains as the longest on-air shift in station history.

External links
KCRH official website
Chabot College Mass Communications Department

CRH
CRH
Radio stations established in 1981
Organizations based in Hayward, California
Chabot College